Abdulrahman bin Saad al-Shahrani (died August 2015) was a major general of the Royal Saudi Land Forces who was killed during the Saudi-led intervention in the Yemeni Civil War. He commanded the 18th Brigade and was killed by an artillery strike from Yemen by the Houthis while inspecting troops at a border post. He was one of the most senior Saudi officers killed in the cross-border fire during the  Yemeni conflict.

References

Saudi Arabian military personnel killed in the Yemeni Civil War (2014–present)
2015 deaths
Place of birth missing
Year of birth missing